CentralWorld (styled as centralwOrld) is a shopping plaza and complex in Bangkok, Thailand. It is the ninth largest shopping complex in the world. The complex, which includes a hotel and office tower, is owned by the company Central Pattana.

History

World Trade Center
Originally called the World Trade Center, the eight-storey mall was opened on 7 April 1990. Central Group acquired the property in 2002 from the Wang Phetchabun group and changed the name to Central World Plaza. In 2005, it was renamed CentralWorld. It is on leased Crown Property Bureau land. In its acquisition, the Central Group's property development arm, Central Pattana (SET: CPN), secured a new 30-year lease on the site.

Mall renovations
Anticipating the opening of the luxury Siam Paragon, CPN started massive renovations and expansion on the site in 2003. CPN changed the name from World Trade Center to Central World Plaza. The original mall structure was 300,000 square meters. The expansion plans boosted that to 430,000 square meters. Though work was not yet complete, CPN held an official opening of the renovated complex on 21 July 2006; it was expected to be fully operational by October 2006. At the time CPN change the name to Centralworld. By May 2007 the mall was fully opened, but some parts of the upper floors remained vacant. Major exterior construction was ongoing on the hotel in the northwest corner of the mall and the extension floors to the ZEN department store in southeast corner.

The renovated complex aimed to attract 150,000 customers per day, spending more than 7 billion baht annually. It marketed itself as a middle class shopping center, opposed to the upper class-market Siam Paragon.

CentralWorld did not achieve its goal in term of daily visitors because of several reasons, including political turmoil and an ongoing economic downturn. However, shopper numbers soon increased, though reliable figures are lacking. Bangkok's New Year countdown celebrations were held in front of CentralWorld, which quickly became a tradition, with the number of people increasing every year.

The Offices at CentralWorld
Renovations included completing an unfinished office tower, work on which had been halted in 1999 with only 39 of the planned 63 floors completed. Construction resumed in early 2003, expanding the tower to a 45-story, 204-meter, design, with the completed tower opening in 2005.

Centara Grand at CentralWorld

Centara Grand is a chain hotel built on land leased from the Crown Properties Bureau. The flagship hotel, the Centara Grand at CentralWorld, is attached to both the CentralWorld mall and the Offices at CentralWorld.

2010 fire damage

CentralWorld was temporarily closed on 19 May 2010 due to severe arson damage, which occurred as troops dislodged protesters from the area during the 2010 Thailand political protests. The adjoining 'Zen' section suffered massive damage from the rioters.

The Isetan portion was reopened soon after. Following repairs, a large part of CentralWorld was reopened on 28 September that year. The 'Zen' section reopened on 6 January 2012.

Mall renovations 2016–2018
Renovations included Enhance circulation and simplified navigation, add escalator in Zone A, re-zone merchandise to suit current market, use open shop-front design to enhance customer experience, enhance linkage to BTS Skytrain, and building for second Apple Store in Thailand.

The renovations started in Autumn 2016 and were due to be completed in 2018.

2019 fire and ZEN renamed into Central
During the evening rush hour on 10 April 2019, a fire that apparently started elsewhere spread to the eighth floor via air vent pipes, and the mall was ordered evacuated. At least two people, both employees, were reported to have died after jumping from the building.

That December, after three decades, ZEN was renamed into Central, positioned as an experimental experience store. The whole Central Department Store's CentralWorld store will be revamped by hiring three famous designers from France, Italy, Germany, and Thailand. The revamp cost 1 billion baht.

Isetan closure and subsequent renovation
On 14 March 2020, Isetan Mitsukoshi Holdings and CPN jointly announced the closure of Isetan Bangkok at CentralWorld per 31 August 2020 due to expiration of contract between two parties. After Isetan closes, CPN plans to renovate the area and the facade while negotiating with new department store anchor replacing Isetan. Renovation will be completed per 1Q 2023, with the Japanese feeling and ambience and its authentic Japanese restaurant zone will be kept intact.

Location
CentralWorld is located in Pathum Wan District at the Ratchaprasong Intersection in one of Bangkok's busiest shopping and tourism districts.

Facilities

CentralWorld Square
The largest outdoor activity square in downtown Bangkok, this covered an area of 8 square kilometres, which was for large-scale activities such as The New Year's Eve Countdown party. There were 400 dancing fountain heads incorporated into the plaza. In 2020, Apple Store opened at this square.

CentralWorld Avenue
CentralWorld Avenue is a six-lane road that circles the complex. It links Rama I Road and Ratchadamri road together.

Anchors

Main anchors
Central Department Store – Previously known as Zen, it is the largest branch of Central Department Store and branded as Asia's first lifestyle trend megastore at that time. It has 50,000 square metres and is seven stories high. Managed by the Central Retail Corporation, the branch will serve as prototype of Central's new concept nationwide.
SF World Cinema – An upscale cinema complex located on the seventh floor, it has a total of 15 screens, which include the 800 seats of World Max Screen and luxury "first-class" theatres. The venue played host to a number of Thai cinema premieres as well as the 2007 Bangkok International Film Festival and the 2008 Bangkok International Film Festival.
GROOVE @ centralWorld The New Zone with varieties of café, restaurants, hang-out space at the front of The Offices

Key tenants
Apple Store – Apple's second Thailand store. Located at CentralWorld Square, right outside the Central Department Store. Recognized as the largest Apple Store in South East Asia.
SuperSports – A large sporting equipment shop.
PowerBuy x B2S Think Space – The flagship and largest branch of the Thailand-based bookstore chain and electronics store chain, it spreads one floor and offers international and local publications, books, stationery, office supplies and various forms of entertainment media. Also, electrical appliances ranging from refrigerators to home theatre systems.
Tops Food Hall – This premium-level supermarket offers household products, fresh fruits and vegetables, dairy products, butcheries and seafood. There are also a wine cellar, a food court and a variety of restaurants and fast food outlets.
 SB Design Square – The flagship store of S.B. Furniture, selling furnitures and home decorate products.
Toys R Us – The flagship location of the store in Thailand, it offers more than 10,000 square meters of imported toys and attractive gadgets and gizmos for teenagers.

 TK Park (Thailand Knowledge Park) – A complex that includes a library, Internet centers, a 4D movie theatre and other media facilities. Owned and operated by the government of Thailand.
Genius Park – A newly added facility, replacing the Asian Senses, it consists of a children's playground, an arcade, and various learning centers for children and adults.
Uniqlo – The first Uniqlo store in Thailand and currently the brand's largest branch in South-East Asia.
H&M – The Largest H&M Store in Southeast Asia and 3rd Largest After Las Vegas' and NYC's.
 The Rink Iceskate – An indoor ice skating rink located at the 2nd floor Forum zone. 
 The ZONE by Fitness First – The largest Fitness First fitness club in South-East Asia.

Former tenants

King Power – A local duty-free store which used to operate on the sixth floor of Zone A. It eventually closed down in June 2006 to make way for the expansion of the ZEN Department Store (now Central Department Store).
Major Cineplex – A former cineplex boasting six screens and twenty-four bowling lanes. The cineplex eventually closed down due to poor business, after SF World Cinema opened in January 2008. This space has since changed into Zone I plaza of CentralWorld.
Centerpoint at CentralWorld – A complex of shops, restaurants, game zones and entertainment venues located on level 7. The complex was developed and operated by Pornpailin Development Co Ltd, who has previously operated the Centerpoint at Siam Square. It closed down in August 2012 to make Edutainment Zone. As of December 2021, this space has converted to Zone I plaza of CentralWorld.
Isetan – The only branch of the Japanese department store chain in Thailand. It has six stories, ranges from apparel to domestic goods. The fifth story of Isetan is dubbed Washoku Gallery, featuring food products imported from Japan. The sixth story features Thailand's first Books Kinokuniya branch. Managed directly by Isetan Mitsukoshi Holdings, it was permanently closed on 31 August 2020. All space of Isetan Bangkok store has since changed into Zone I plaza of CentralWorld.

Hotel
 The Centara Grand & Bangkok Convention Centre at CentralWorld is a 57-storey 5-star hotel. There are 17,000 square metres area of convention hall and numerous function rooms on level 22nd of the hotel.

Shrines
Two Hindu shrines are located at the north-east corner of CentralWorld: one dedicated to Trimurti and used by people praying for true love, and one dedicated to Ganesha.

See also
List of shopping malls in Bangkok
List of shopping malls in Thailand
List of largest shopping malls in Thailand
List of the world's largest shopping malls
Ratchaprasong

Further reading

Notes

References

External links

 
 Central Pattana: company site
 Altoon + Porter Architects: company site
 ZEN lifestyle trend megastore
 Isetan Group
 Modulo Language School Homepage

Shopping malls in Bangkok
Central Pattana
Pathum Wan district
Shopping malls established in 1990
1990 establishments in Thailand